Shri Krishna Chaudhary is the former Director General of National Disaster Response Force, Director General of Railway Protection Force, Director General of Indo-Tibetan Border Police and an IPS officer of 1979 batch from Bihar cadre.

He also served as a Superintendent of Police in Central Bureau of Investigation (CBI) for four years.

References

Indian Police Service officers
Chiefs of Indo-Tibetan Border Police